Siegfried Knappe (15 January 1917 – 1 December 2008) was an officer in the German Army (Heer) during World War II. Towards the end of the war, Knappe was stationed in Berlin, where he gave daily briefings at the Führerbunker.

Biography 
As a young artillery lieutenant (Leutnant der Artillerie) in Panzer Group Kleist, Siegfried Knappe participated in the  Invasion of France. Knappe was decorated for actions that took place on the night of 14 June 1940. The actions took place in the Paris area, south of Tremblay-en-France, at the Ourcq canal. A group of French sailors had apparently not been informed of the decision to declare Paris an open city. As a result, they were defending a bridge with machine guns from a house across the canal. After German infantry failed to clear the area with mortar fire, artillery support was requested.

Although Knappe was the Battalion Adjutant and it was not his duty to man the gun, he moved up to the front with the infantry. Because the area was wooded, the 105 mm gun had to be brought up and fired almost at point blank range directly into the house.  The German infantry was hidden behind a building by the bridge, where the gun was maneuvered, but in order to fire all seven crew members would be exposed to machine gun fire. On the mark, the gun was moved, aimed, and fired. Three of the seven crew members were wounded but the machine gun nest was destroyed. This action opened the road for the infantry.

Knappe was wounded by a bullet entering the back of his hand and exiting through his wrist. On 19 June 1940, he was evacuated. For his bravery, Knappe received the Iron Cross 2nd Class. He also received the Black Wound Badge for his wounds.

Knappe went on to fight on the Eastern Front and the Italian Campaign.  While participating in the invasion of the Soviet Union in 1941, he received the Iron Cross 1st class for his bravery, in particular for leading artillery attacks from forward positions.

Knappe was also wounded an additional three times in the course of his career. After attending General Staff College, he rose to the rank of Major. Knappe ended the war fighting in Berlin while a member of General Helmuth Weidling's staff.

Post-war 
After five years of captivity in the Soviet Union, Knappe was released to West Germany in 1949. Knappe emigrated to the United States with his wife, Lieselotte ("Lilo"; nee Brecht), who died in 2002, and their children, and settled in Ohio. There he wrote his memoir, Soldat. (Soldat is German for soldier.)

In media
The Oscar-nominated film Downfall (2004), about German dictator Adolf Hitler's last days, was based in part on Knappe's memoirs. He is also portrayed in the movie Downfall, as the adjutant to General Weidling.

Awards and decorations
 Sudetenland Medal
 Wound Badge (1939)
 in Black
 in Silver
 Iron Cross (1939)
 2nd Class
 1st Class
 General Assault Badge
 Eastern Front Medal

References

1917 births
German autobiographers
2008 deaths
German prisoners of war in World War II held by the Soviet Union
German emigrants to the United States
Recipients of the Iron Cross (1939), 1st class
German male non-fiction writers
German Army officers of World War II
Military personnel from Schleswig-Holstein